This is a list of States and Union Territories of India ranked by access to safe drinking water.

List 
The list is compiled from the 2011 India Census Report published by Government of India. The rank is based on the percentage of households which have access to safe drinking water.

Punjab ranked highest with 97.6%, while Kerala has the worst rank with only 33.5% households having access to safe drinking water. National average stands at 85.5%.

Access to safe drinking water in households of India (%)

References 

 

Safe drinking water
States and union territories by access to safe drinking water